The Ayala Center is a major commercial development operated by Ayala Land located in the Makati Central Business District in Makati, Metro Manila, Philippines.

About the Center
The Ayala Center is a recreational, shopping, dining, and entertainment development located in the heart of Makati. It is bounded by Ayala Avenue to the east, Epifanio de los Santos Avenue (EDSA) to the south, Arnaiz Avenue to the west, and to the north by Legazpi Street and Paseo de Roxas. The Ayala station of MRT Line 3 serves the area.

The development originally started in 1988 and 1991 with a number of separate shopping arcades and Greenbelt Park before expanding to cover over 50 hectares of facilities. Today the complex includes several malls, each with its own shopping and restaurant arcades and cinemas; three department stores, a number of hotels; and the Ayala Museum, showcasing exhibits on Philippine history and art.

Shopping malls
Glorietta
Greenbelt
The Link
One Ayala (under construction)

Department stores
Rustan's
SM Makati
The Landmark
Adora
Marks & Spencer
Debenhams(closed as of May 2021)

Parking facilities
Aside from interconnected basement parking beneath Glorietta and Greenbelt malls, the following are the carpark buildings located at the complex:
6750 Steel Carpark
Park Square
Paseo Steel Carpark
The Link

Hotels
InterContinental Manila (closed in 2015)
Dusit Thani
Holiday Inn & Suites Makati 
Makati Fairmont Hotel and Raffles Suites and Residences 
New World Renaissance Hotel
Makati Shangri-La (closed in 2021)
Ascott Hotel (formerly the Oakwood Premier)
Seda Hotel (under construction)

Office buildings
 
6750 Ayala Avenue
Glorietta 1 Corporate Center
Glorietta 2 Corporate Center
One Ayala Towers 1 & 2

Incidents

2000 bombing
On May 17, 2000, at 5:02 p.m., Glorietta was bombed, injuring 12 persons, mostly teenagers. According to local authorities, the homemade bomb was placed in front of a toilet beside a video arcade. This bombing was said to be a precursor to the May 21, 2000 SM Megamall bombing and the December 30, 2000 Rizal Day bombings.

2007 explosion

The 2007 Glorietta explosion ripped through the Glorietta 2 section of the Glorietta shopping complex at Ayala Center in Makati on October 19, 2007, killing 11 people and injuring 120. Despite conflicting reports, it was concluded that the explosion was caused by a faulty liquefied petroleum gas tank located in a Chinese restaurant.

See also
Ayala Center Cebu
Alabang Town Center

References

External links

Ayala Malls, Official Website
 Inquirer.net, List of dead and injured in Glorietta blast
 Inquirer.net, View interactive map and photos of Glorietta blast
 GMA NEWS.TV, Partial list of casualties in Glorietta blast

Buildings and structures completed in 1991
1991 establishments in the Philippines
Skyscrapers in Makati
Makati Central Business District
Districts in Metro Manila
Mixed-use developments in Metro Manila
Shopping districts and streets in Metro Manila